Forrest Barth Burmeister (August 18, 1913 – December 5, 1997) was an American football player who spent two years in the National Football League.

External links 
 

1913 births
1997 deaths
American football offensive guards
American football offensive tackles
Cleveland Rams players
Purdue Boilermakers football players